Aframomum sulcatum is a species of plant in the ginger family, Zingiberaceae. It was first described by Daniel Oliver, Daniel Hanbury, and John Gilbert Baker and got its current name from Karl Moritz Schumann.

References 

sulcatum